Annemarie Wendl (26 December 1914, Trostberg, Upper Bavaria – 3 September 2006, Munich, Bavaria) was a German actress.

Career

Wendl was born into an upper-class family in Bavaria and began her training as an actress in Berlin at Lucie Höflich's seminar. 

Afterwards, she played classical roles on stage in Berlin, Bonn, Augsburg, Innsbruck, Munich, Bamberg and Ingolstadt. In her youth, she played "all sentimental characters", such as Faust's Gretchen and Emilia Galotti. Later she played character roles, such as Adelheid in Götz von Berlichingen, Blanche DuBois in A Streetcar Named Desire, Maria Stuart in the play by Schiller and  the title role in Brecht's Mother Courage. Her last theatrical works were The Widow in the Green Tree (1997) and Sanssouci in 2001.

Wendl began working in film in 1961 and made more than 35 films and TV productions. 

During her long career on the big screen, Wendl was seen in some of Rainer Werner Fassbinder's films (including I Only Want You To Love Me, 1976). Her television work includes series like , Meister Eder und sein Pumuckl and Der Kommissar, where she made guest appearances in a few episodes.

Wendl was best known for her role as "Else Kling" in the German weekly soap opera Lindenstraße, which started in December 1985. She appeared in the first episode Herzlich Willkommen and remained in the series' cast until May 2006. Her character, Else Kling, lost her husband, Egon Kling, in a car accident in Paris, France in 1998. In the episode "Abschied und Ankunft" (#1069), Else Kling died.

She was called "the nation's caretaker" or also "the nation's worst blabbermouth" (due to her character's habit of unceasingly spreading gossip). She appeared in some commercials depicting Else Kling and sang rap songs. She published two CDs, Du Depp in 1993 and Else Goes Dance in 1995. Else Kling was often compared to J.R. Ewing.

Personal life
Privately, Wendl worked with young people and liked to wear fashionable clothes. On the Lindenstraße homepage her birthday was initially given as 26 December 1921 or 1922 until she turned 90 in 2004. An official correction was published, revealing that Wendl was somewhat older than her character (Else Kling was born on 14 May 1922, and died on 25 May 2006 at the age of 84).

Last years and death

In 2005, Wendl suffered a stroke and had three bouts of pneumonia, which caused her to cease work on Lindenstraße. After her character's death, Wendl received coverage in the yellow press quite regularly, most notably about her health.

Wendl, who was married to Siegmar Kleinschmidt from 1942 until his death in 1944, lived in Munich and died at age 91 in 2006. 

She was survived by her son. Her fellow actors from Lindenstrasse, including Marie-Luise Marjan, Bill Mockridge, and Hans W. Geißendörfer, attended her funeral.

References

External links

 

1914 births
2006 deaths
German film actresses
German stage actresses
German television actresses
German soap opera actresses
20th-century German actresses
21st-century German actresses
People from Traunstein (district)